Sir Francis Derek Jakeway  (6 June 1915 – 6 November 1993) was a British colonial administrator, who was instrumental in preparing several British colonies for self-government, and who played a key role in preparing a somewhat unwilling Colonial Fiji for independence.

Career 
Jakeway spent seventeen years with the Colonial Administrative Service in Nigeria (1937 - 1954); during this time, he was seconded to the Seychelles from 1946 to 1949, and the Colonial Office from 1949 to 1951. He served in Sarawak from 1959 to 1963. He became Governor of Fiji in 1964, serving until 1968. It was during his tenure that a measure of self-government was introduced to Fiji in 1964, followed by responsible government 1967, in preparation for the granting of independence in 1970.

The first part of this two-stage process involved appointing members of the Legislative Council to oversee government departments. Only 18 of the 37 Legislative Council members were popularly elected; these eighteen were equally divided between the three principal ethnic groups - Fijians, Indo-Fijians, and Europeans. The six elected members of each ethnic group were allowed to nominate two of their own members to serve on the Executive Council. This "Member system", as it was known, did not introduce a Cabinet in the modern sense: Members so appointed were responsible only to the Governor, not to the Legislative Council. But it was a crucial stepping stone to the second stage: following elections in 1966 - to a reconstituted Legislative Council that was, for the first time, wholly elected (except for two members nominated by the Great Council of Chiefs) - responsible government was introduced, with a Chief Minister and a Cabinet responsible to the Legislative Council. Jakeway appointed Ratu Kamisese Mara, leader of the Alliance Party, which had handily won the election, as Chief Minister.

Jakeway was succeeded as Governor by Sir Robert Sidney Foster in 1968 and retired to Exmouth, Devon, where he became Chairman of the British Health Authority, from which he retired in 1977.

Personal life 
Jakeway married Phyllis Watson in 1941. Together they had three sons.

Honours 
Jakeway was awarded the Order of the British Empire (OBE) in 1948 and was created a Companion of the Order of St Michael and St George (CMG) in 1956. In 1963, he was made a Knight Commander of the Order of St Michael and St George (KCMG).

References 

1915 births
1993 deaths
Colonial Administrative Service officers
Governors of Fiji
Knights Commander of the Order of St Michael and St George
Officers of the Order of the British Empire
People from Exmouth
British expatriates in Nigeria
British expatriates in Fiji
People from colonial Nigeria